Zoe Miller (born 17 November 1975) is a former association football player who represented New Zealand at international level.

Miller made her Football Ferns début as a substitute in a 0–1 loss to Bulgaria on 24 August 1994, and finished her international career with five caps to her credit.

References

1975 births
Living people
New Zealand women's international footballers
New Zealand women's association footballers
Women's association footballers not categorized by position